Galbulimima baccata, the northern pigeonberry ash is a rare rainforest tree found in two populations in Queensland, Australia. It is likely to be a poisonous and hallucinogenic plant like the related Galbulimima belgraveana. The fruit is eaten by cassowaries and rainforest pigeons.

Scripps Research Institute finds a novel method of synthesizing Galbulimima sp.(G. belgraveana) compounds for psychotropic applications.

References

Flora of Queensland
Magnoliales
Trees of Australia